Vijaykumar is an Indian name. Notable people with the name include:

Paidikalva Vijaykumar (born 1986), Indian cricketer
Sridevi Vijaykumar (born 1986), Indian actress
Vijaykumar Rupani (born 1956), Indian politician

Indian surnames